The 1964 United States Senate election in California was held on November 3, 1964. 

Incumbent Democratic Senator Clair Engle was suffering from an advanced brain tumor and ended his campaign for re-election in April. He died in office in July. Pierre Salinger, Press Secretary to Lyndon Johnson and the winner of the Democratic primary, was appointed in his place. 

Salinger lost election to a full, six-year term to Republican George Murphy, a retired Hollywood star. This was the only Senate seat Republicans gained in 1964.

Democratic primary

Candidates
Emanuel Braude
Walter Buchanan, candidate for U.S. Representative in 1934 and 1962
Demos Cordeiro
 Alan Cranston, California Controller
Harold E. Fields
Lynn Johnston, candidate for U.S. Representative in 1963
 George H. McLain, perennial candidate, nativist, and pensioner advocate
Henry A. Mermel
Mark Morris
Guido Joseph Pavia, resident of Napa
 Pierre Salinger, White House Press Secretary

Declined to run
Stanley Mosk, California Attorney General (appointed to California Supreme Court)

Withdrew
 Clair Engle, incumbent Senator (died July 30)

Campaign
A major point of contention during the primary and general elections was Salinger's eligibility to run. He was working at the White House and officially a resident of Virginia, meaning he could not vote for himself.

Results

Republican primary

Candidates
 Fred Hall, former Governor of Kansas
 Leland M. Kaiser
 George Murphy, retired actor and former President of the Screen Actors Guild

Results

General election

Results

See also 
 1964 United States Senate elections

References 

1964
California
United States Senate